Sruoga is a Lithuanian surname. Notable people with the surname include:

Balys Sruoga (1896-1947), Lithuanian author
Daniela Sruoga (born 1987), Argentine  field hockey player
Josefina Sruoga (born 1990),  Argentine field hockey player

Lithuanian-language surnames